Kelvin Davis may refer to:
Kelvin Davis (basketball) (born 1959), American basketball player
Kelvin Davis (boxer) (born 1978), American boxer
Kelvin Davis (businessman) (born c. 1965), American businessman, Texas Pacific Group
Kelvin Davis (footballer) (born 1976), English footballer
Kelvin Davis (politician) (born 1967), New Zealand politician

See also
Kelvin Davies, American professor